Between Speech & Song is an album by a jazz band co-led by alto saxophonist Eric Pakula, pianist Pandelis Karayorgis and drummer Eric Rosenthal, which was recorded in 1993 and released on Cadence Jazz.

Reception

In his review for AllMusic, Alex Henderson states "Karayorgis pushes Pakula toward his more cerebral side, and the altoist sounds like he's enjoying every minute of it."

Track listing
 "Wild White Rat" (Eric Pakula) – 4:02
 "Me & Kate" (Eric Pakula) – 4:57
 "Pass the Butter" (Eric Pakula) – 7:04
 "Jerky Sockets" (Pandelis Karayorgis) – 4:48
 "If I Fall In Love" (Eric Pakula) – 5:16
 "Lennie's Pennies" (Lennie Tristano) – 3:26
 "Tell Me, Tell Me" (Pandelis Karayorgis) – 6:47
 "Tritone Tango Blues" (Eric Pakula) – 5:40
 "Segment" (Eric Pakula) – 2:04
 "August Thursday" (Pandelis Karayorgis) – 4:56
 "I Know Why You're Lonely" (Eric Pakula) – 5:54
 "Eric's Alto Ego" (Pandelis Karayorgis) – 4:13
 "Augmented Blues" (Eric Pakula) – 3:52
 "Election" (Eric Pakula) – 1:07

Personnel
Eric Pakula - alto sax
Pandelis Karayorgis - piano
Jonathan Robinson - bass
Eric Rosenthal - drums
Mat Maneri - electric violin on 7 & 8

References

1994 albums
Pandelis Karayorgis albums
Cadence Jazz Records albums